Francis Ramacciotti (c. 1826 Leghorn, Italy – 13 June 1891 Manhattan) was an Italian-born inventor who founded a major piano string manufacturer in the United States.

Career 
Ramacciotti was reportedly associated with Garibaldi and held a military rank. Ramaciotti immigrated to the US in 1848, moving to Buffalo, New York. He apprenticed in a piano company in Buffalo before founding his own piano string company, the F. Ramacciotti company, in 1852. While in Buffalo, Ramociotti played bassoon as a member of the Metropolitan Theater Orchestra under the direction of Albert Benjamin Poppendorf (1819–1900).

Ramacciotti – on June 12, 1952, in Buffalo – married Rachel Caroline Rendt (maiden; 1833–1914) of Detroit. The couple had five children: (i) Italo Francis Ramacciotti (1853–1911), (ii) Hugo Louis Ramacciotti (1855–1907), (iii) Alberto "Albert" De M. Ramacciott (1857–1926), (iv) Eugenia W. Ramacciotti (1860–1938; married to Edward G. Johnson), and (v) Emma Serena Ramacciotti (1869–1963; married to Milton Lockwood Bouden; 1866–1938).

In 1867, Ramaciotti moved his company to New York City.  He invented and patented the first modern bass string for the piano. Previous piano strings used iron winding over iron. This modern invention using a special new machine used copper wound over iron. The company was one of the top makers of piano strings in the world for several decades.

In 1891, Francis Ramacciotti died. His son Albert took over the company the next year.  Albert expanded it to one of the three top string makers in the nation.

Selected patents 

 1883: US 280512 A – "Spinning Lathes for Winding Piano-Strings."
 1893: US 508974 A – "Machine for Swaging Wire for Musical Instruments."
 1902: US 740918 A – "Bass String for Pianos or Other Musical Instruments."

Bibliography

Notes

References

 

 

  – 
 
 

  – 
 
 

  – 
 
 

  ; .
 

  .
 

 
 
  ;  & . 
 
 
 
 
"One day a foreman in the Ramacciotti plant, John —, who had been a boy apprentice when"  "that was the end of the New York Cooperative Piano String Co."

  ; .
 
 
 

  ; .
 {{hanging indent |text=
" Francesco Ramacciotti, who died June 13, [1894]." "The lodge met in a hall corner of Third Avenue and Eighty-Sixth Street." "Ramacciotti joined the lodge in 1871 "

  .
"Ramacciotti F. Inc, 421 W. 28th St. — Manuf. of Piano Wire and Bass Strings — Panels."

 
 {{hanging indent |text=
"The sworn statement of Francis Ramacciotti, dated January 21, 1915, covering bass strings "
Note: The petitioner, Albert Francis (Alberto "Albert" De M. Ramacciotti; 1857–1926), was Francis Ramacciotti's son.

Piano makers
1826 births
1891 deaths